Saint-Setiers is a commune in the Corrèze department in
central France.

Geography
The river Diège has its source in the northeastern part of the commune and forms most of its southeastern boundary.

Population

Points of interest
Parc Arboretum de Saint-Setiers

See also
Communes of the Corrèze department

References

Communes of Corrèze
Corrèze communes articles needing translation from French Wikipedia